Sadat e-Bara sometimes pronounced Sadaat-e-Bahara, are an Indian Muslim community of Sayyids, originally Elite or Noble Sayyid families situated in the Muzaffarnagar district of Uttar Pradesh in India. This community had considerable influence during the reign of the Mughal Empire. Its members were also found in Karnal District and Haryana, Gujarat & Karnataka, Maharashtra state in India.Some of the members of this community have migrated to Pakistan after independence and have settled in Karachi, Khairpur State in Sind and Lahore. 
Sadat e Bara or Sayads of Barha or Saadat-e-Barha 
Saadat Bara/Saiyids of Barha

Ancestry
The ancestor of Bārha Sayyids, Sayyid Abu'l Farah Al Hussaini Al Wasti, left his original home in Wasit, Iraq, with his twelve sons at the end of the 10th century or the beginning of the 11th  century CE and migrated to India, where he obtained four estates in Punjab. Over time, Abu'l Farah's descendants took over Bārha riyasat (township) in Muzzafarnagar.

There are four sub-divisions of Barha Sadaat in Muzaffarnagar area:
 the Tihaanpuri, whose chief town was Jansath, belong to Syed Najm uddin
 the Chatraudi, whose chief town was Sambhalhera, belong to syed abu'l Fazaail Al Wasti,
 the Kundliwal, whose chief town was Mujhera, belong to Syed Daoud.
 the Jajneri, whose chief town was Bidauli, belong to Syed Abu'l Faraaish,

The origin of the Sadaat-e-Bara or Barha is traced to Sayyid Abu'l Farah Al Hussaini Al Wasti, son of Sayyid Daud Al Hussaini, who came to Ghazni in Afghanistan, from Wasit, at the invitation of Mahmud Ghaznavi. He had twelve sons of whom four settled in four villages Kundli Tihanpur, Jajner and Chhat-Banur, near the city of Patiala. These four sons founded a number of clans, the main ones being Chhatrodi, Kundliwal, Tihanpuri and Jajneri, from the villages assigned to them.

History

Role in the Mughal empire

The Barha Sayyid tribe of Indian Muslims traditionally composed the vanguard of the imperial army, which they held the hereditary right to lead in every battle.  

Aurangzeb's warning to his sons to be cautious in dealing with the Sayyids of Barha, "...because a strong partner in government soon wants to seize the kingship for himself", would eventually become prophetic.

Six years after the death of Aurangzeb, the Barhas became kingmakers in the Mughal empire under Qutub-ul-Mulk and Ihtisham-ul-Mulk, creating and deposing Mughal emperors at will. Farrukhsiyar defeated the Mughal emperor Jahandar Shah at the Battle of Agra, due to the reckless bravery of the Barha Sayyids, and rose as the Mughal emperor as a puppet of the Syed brothers. Farrukhsiyar was executed on the orders of the Syed Brothers, who raised three consequtive emperors to the throne.

After the Mughal empire
The Syeds of Barha were recruited in the Subah of Bengal, and proved to a formidable resistance to Alivardi Khan.  Mirza Baqir Ali led a rebellion against Alivardi Khan, with a contingent composed of the Syeds of Barha. The Barha Syeds exhibited feats of hereditary gallantry, causing Alivardi Khan's men to flee from the battlefield.

The Barha Sayyids regained many of their estates from the Marathas and regained their status in the parganah by the time of British arrival.

Modern Era

In the 20th century, Mohsin-ul-Mulk founded the Urdu Defence Association, or the Anjuman-i Taraqqi-i Urdu, committed to the perpetuation of the Urdu language. Although the Syeds of Barha were Shi'as, Mohsin-ul-Mulk converted to Sunni Islam and authored the book Ayat-i Bayanat in which he showed why the Sunni faith was preferable. Mohsin-ul-Mulk was one of the founders of the All India Muslim League in 1906.

See also 
 Sadaat
 Sadaat-e-Bilgram
 Barha dynasty

References

External links 
 http://therepublicofrumi.com/msrangeela.htm

Pakistani people of Iraqi descent
Social groups of Pakistan
Muslim communities of India
Social groups of Uttar Pradesh
Muslim communities of Uttar Pradesh
Muzaffarnagar district
Hashemite people
Twelver Shi'ism